What a Day is the title of the first solo album by Phil Keaggy, originally released in 1973, on New Song Records. It was later reissued on vinyl by Nissi Records and then on CD by Myrrh Records together with Keaggy's second solo album, Love Broke Thru.

Track listing
All songs written by Phil Keaggy except where noted.

Personnel 

 Phil Keaggy – all instruments and vocals, producer, arranger

Production notes
 Gary Hedden – co-producer, engineer

References

1973 debut albums
Phil Keaggy albums